Scopula lubricata is a moth of the  family Geometridae. It is found in Angola, the Democratic Republic of Congo, Kenya, Sierra Leone and South Africa.

References

Moths described in 1905
lubricata
Insects of Angola
Moths of Africa